Sutamarchán is a town and municipality in the Ricaurte Province, part of the department of Boyacá of Colombia. It borders Santa Sofía in the north, Sáchica and Villa de Leyva in the east, Saboyá in the west and Ráquira and Tinjacá in the south.

Etymology 
The name Sutamarchán is derived from the Chibcha sovereign Suta and Spanish marchán: "Merchant of the sovereign Suta". Marchán refers to Pedro Merchan de Velasco, who was an 18th-century encomendero of Suta.

History 
Sutamarchán in the times before the Spanish conquest was inhabited by the Muisca, organized in their loose Muisca Confederation. Sutamarchán was ruled by the zaque of Hunza.

Modern Sutamarchán was founded on December 14, 1556, by Antonio de Santana.

Economy 
The main economical activities of Sutamarchán are agriculture, livestock farming and tourism. Among the agricultural products potatoes, onions, tomatoes, barley, maize, grapes and the Colombian fruit curuba are cultivated. The town is famous for its longaniza sausages. Tourism is mainly religious; tourists visit the Santo Ecce Homo Convent.

Since June 15, 2004, a Tomatina festival, like the famous original in Buñol, Spain, is celebrated in Sutamarchán.

Born in Sutamarchán 
 Pedro González (humorist)

Gallery

Panoramas

References 

Municipalities of Boyacá Department
Populated places established in 1556
1556 establishments in the Spanish Empire
Muisca Confederation
Muysccubun